The 1938 Colorado A&M Aggies football team was an American football team that represented Colorado State College of Agriculture and Mechanic Arts—now known as Colorado State University—in the Mountain States Conference (MSC) during the 1938 college football season.  In their 28th season under head coach Harry W. Hughes, the Aggies compiled a 1–5–2 record (0–4–2 against MSC opponents), finished last in the MSC, and were outscored by a total of 103 to 37.

Schedule

References

Colorado AandM
Colorado State Rams football seasons
Colorado AandM Aggies football